Edward James "Ace" Lynch (October 4, 1896 – August 24, 1967) was a professional American football lineman. He played five seasons  in the National Football League (NFL), for the Rochester Jeffersons (1925), the Detroit Panthers (1926), the Hartford Blues (1926), the Providence Steam Roller (1927), and the Orange Tornadoes (1929).

References

1896 births
1967 deaths
American football ends
American football tackles
Catholic University Cardinals football players
Detroit Panthers players
Hartford Blues players
Orange Tornadoes players
Providence Steam Roller players
Rochester Jeffersons players
People from Northampton, Massachusetts
Players of American football from Massachusetts